Alien from L.A. is a 1988 science fiction film directed by Albert Pyun and starring Kathy Ireland as a young woman who visits the underground civilization of Atlantis. The film was featured on Mystery Science Theater 3000. This film is loosely based on Jules Verne's 1864 novel Journey to the Center of the Earth with some minor allusions to The Wizard of Oz.

Plot
Wanda Saknussemm (Kathy Ireland) is a nerdy social misfit with large glasses and an unusually squeaky voice who lives in Los Angeles and works at a diner. After being dumped by her boyfriend for "not having a sense of adventure", Wanda is informed by a letter that her father, an archaeologist, fell into a bottomless pit and died. She flies to Zamboanga North Africa ("Deepest Africa" says the envelope's return address) and while going through her father's belongings, she finds his notes about Atlantis, apparently an alien ship that crashed millennia ago and sank into the center of the Earth. Wanda comes across a chamber beneath her father's apartment and accidentally sets off a chain of events that ultimately cause her to fall into a deep hole.

An unharmed Wanda wakes up deep within the Earth to find Gus (William R. Moses), a miner whom she protects from being slain by two people. Gus agrees to help Wanda find her father, whom she believes is alive and trapped underground. Wanda soon discovers that both she and her father are believed to be spies planning an invasion of Atlantis. People from the surface world are referred to as "aliens" by Atlanteans, who appear virtually identical to surface dwellers, and when Wanda is overheard talking about Malibu Beach by a low-life informant (Janie Du Plessis), she soon becomes a hunted woman and must dodge efforts at capture, both from the mysterious "Government House" and from thugs in the pay of the crime lord Mambino (Deep Roy).

Wanda's efforts at escape are aided by Charmin' (Thom Mathews), a handsome rogue who (briefly) assists her flight and falls for Wanda. She is ultimately captured by the evil General Pykov (Du Plessis again), who wants to kill both Wanda and her incarcerated father. Before the Atlantean leader can decide what to do with Wanda and her father, Gus shows up and helps the duo escape while fighting off General Pykov and her soldiers. Wanda and her father board a ship that takes them back to the surface and the film ends with Wanda on the beach, wearing a bikini and a sarong. She refuses the advances of her ex-boyfriend and is soon reunited with Charmin', who inexplicably appears on a motorcycle.

Cast
 Kathy Ireland as Wanda Saknussemm
 William R. Moses as Guten "Gus" Edway
 Richard Haines as Professor Arnold Saknussemm
 Don Michael Paul as Robbie
 Thom Mathews as "Charmin'"
 Janie Du Plessis as General Rykov / Shank / Claims Officer
 Simon Poland as Consul Triton Crassus / The Mailman
 Linda Kerridge as Roryis Freki / Auntie Pearl
 Kristen Trucksess as Stacy
 Lochner de Kock as Professor Ovid Galba / Paddy Mahoney
 Deep Roy as Mambino, The Boss of Bosses

Production

Alien from L.A. was shot by Golan-Globus Productions and distributed by The Cannon Group.

Casting
Kathy Ireland was chosen by director Albert Pyun after seeing a photo of her, and without doing a screen test. Ireland had little acting experience and said "No one was more surprised than I was." stating that she took acting lessons afterwards. The film was Ireland's debut in a major motion picture. The character's surname of "Saknussemm" is taken from the original Journey to the Center of the Earth by Jules Verne.

Ireland says that changes were made to her character between the time when she was cast and when filming began. "And when I got on the set I found out that they had changed my whole character around which surprised me but I liked her better. When I read for the part she had been a flirty Madonna type. They had changed her to a geeky clumsy shy type of girl which I liked better. The changes made her more likable and I was able to draw on a couple of periods in my life when I went through awkward phases."Kathy Ireland was hired for the lead role toward the end of the film's casting, as the crew was unable to find someone who could suitably lead the film. According to director Albert Pyun, Ireland was cast for her tall stature, as he wanted to illustrate a physical difference between people from the surface and people who were closer to the Earth's center.

Filming

The filming locations for the film include Los Angeles, California, Redondo beach, South Africa, and Namibia.

The film was mostly shot in Johannesburg, at producer Avi Lerner's studio, plus additional shooting in Durban, South Africa and Swakopmund, Namibia. Locations ranged from South Africa's deep digging mines and gold fields both on the outskirts of Johannesburg. There was one additional day of shooting at a safari complex near Pretoria. Most of the Namibia shoot took place in and around the old German colonial town of Swakopmund, with additional scenes also shot along Namibia's famed Skeleton Coast. The film was also shot in Los Angeles, California.

The sets of the film are inspired by "future noir" from films such as 1979's Alien and 1982's Blade Runner.

Soundtrack
Two songs used in the film were "Once Upon a Time", performed by Steve LeGassick, and "State of Heart", performed by Donna DeLory.

Release
Alien from L.A. was released on February 26, 1988.

Reception 
Joe Bob Briggs called it a "pretty decent film" and then gave it two stars. Rebecca Harris of the Abilene Reporter-News gave the film 2.5 stars out of 4. Film reviewer David Picking said the film was "a cheapo adventure movie without a single redeeming quality"

Reviewing the DVD release, Rob Thomas of The Capital Times, said "Completely awful - you can't believe they're serious." Daniel M. Kimmel of the Worcester Telegram & Gazette gave the film just one out of 5 stars.

Home media
Alien from L.A. was released on VHS by Media Home Entertainment in June 1995. It was later released on DVD by MGM on June 7, 2005, paired with Morons from Outer Space; the only special feature for the release was the film's trailer. It has been released and is currently available in a Blu-ray edition by Vinegar Syndrome that includes an interview with director Albert Pyun (“Making a Fairytale”), an interview with actor Thom Mathews (“Putting the puzzle together”), and an audio interview with actress Linda Kerridge.

Sequel
Alien from L.A. was followed by a direct-to-video sequel called Journey to the Center of the Earth (also directed by Albert Pyun), which was released in the United States in 1989. The film had Kathy Ireland reprising her role as Wanda Saknussemm.

References

External links

Theatrical trailer

1988 films
1980s science fiction adventure films
1980s science fiction comedy films
1988 comedy films
American science fiction comedy films
1980s English-language films
Fiction portraying humans as aliens
Films directed by Albert Pyun
Films set in Atlantis
Films set in Los Angeles
Films set in North Africa
Films shot in Los Angeles
Films shot in Namibia
Films shot in Gauteng
Films shot in KwaZulu-Natal
Golan-Globus films
Films produced by Menahem Golan
Films produced by Yoram Globus
1980s American films